The South Line of Chennai Suburban Railway is the fourth longest suburban line that runs southwards from Chennai (Madras) City. It is the oldest suburban line of Chennai (Madras), opened in 1931. Suburban services terminate at Chengalpattu (Chingleput) and MEMU services at Villupuram. The capacity utilisation of Chennai Beach-Egmore-Tambaram section is 69 percent. The tract travels along the GST Road from St.Thomas Mount to Villupuram.

Sections

Beach–Tambaram
 This 30 km section has (1st and 2nd line) 2 dedicated lines for the suburban train operations apart from 2 main lines for mixed traffic.
 EMUs are operated along 3rd and 4th main lines during peak hours.
 12-car EMU are operated in this sector.

Tambaram–Chengalpattu
 This 31 km section has three railway lines in which suburban trains as well as long distance (south bound) trains are operated.
 12-car EMU are operated in this sector.

Beach–Melmaruvathur
 Two MEMU services between Chennai Beach and Melmaruvathur and one between Chennai Egmore - Puducherry is operational. This is a double electrified line.

Tambaram–Villupuram 
 One MEMU Train service is operational between Tambaram and Villupuram.

Melmaruvathur–Villupuram
 A MEMU service is operational between Melmaruvathur and Villupuram.

Hours of Operation
 Chennai Beach–Tambaram
The first EMU starts from Chennai Beach at 3:55 and the last train at 23:59. Most of the trains in this section end at Tambaram station. The peak hour headway is 7 minutes and the headway at the first and last hours of operation is 20 minutes.

 Tambaram–Chennai Beach
The first EMU starts from Tambaram at 4:00 and the last train at 23.55.  Peak hour headway is 7 minutes.

 Tambaram–Chengalpattu
The first EMU starts from Tambaram at 4:50 and the last train at 23:40. Peak hour headway is 15 minutes.

 Chengalpattu–Tambaram
The first EMU starts from Chengalpattu at 4:05 and the last train at 23.10. Peak hour headway is 15 minutes.

 Chennai Beach–Melmaruvathur
 Two service from Chennai Beach to Melmaruvathur at 08:30 and 11:10
 Two services from Melmaruvathur to Chennai Beach at 15:30 and 17:50
 Melmaruvathur–Villupuram
 Two services from Melmaruvathur to Villupuram at 11:40 and 13:15
 Two services from Villupuram to Melmaruvathur at 13:45 and 15:10

Gallery

Guindy station in 2006

References 

Chennai Suburban Railway
Railway lines opened in 1931